Bottuguda is one of the  commercial and residential suburbs in Nalgonda district, in Telangana State.

References

Villages in Nalgonda district
Nalgonda district